The Man Who Saved the World is a 2013 feature-length Danish documentary film by filmmaker Peter Anthony about Stanislav Petrov, a former lieutenant colonel of the Soviet Air Defence Forces and his role in preventing the 1983 Soviet nuclear false alarm incident from leading to nuclear holocaust.

The film premiered in October 2014 at the Woodstock Film Festival in Woodstock, New York, winning; "Honorable Mention: Audience Award Winner for Best Narrative Feature" and "Honorable Mention: James Lyons Award for Best Editing of a Narrative Feature." On 22 February 2018 the film premiered in Russia at the Documentary Film Center in Moscow.

Synopsis 

On 26 September 1983, the computers in the Serpukhov-15 bunker outside Moscow, which housed the command centre of the Soviet early warning satellite system, twice reported that U.S. intercontinental ballistic missiles were heading toward the Soviet Union. Stanislav Petrov, who was duty officer that night, suspected that the system was malfunctioning and managed to convince his superiors of the same thing. He argued that if the U.S. was going to attack pre-emptively it would do so with more than just five missiles, and that it was best to wait for ground radar confirmation before launching a counter-attack.

The documentary features Petrov's 2006 trip to the US with interpreter Galina. On the trip, Petrov visits the UN, meets among others Kevin Costner and visits a decommissioned Minuteman missile silo.

Production notes 
In the film, footage of Petrov today is intertwined with re-enactments of the dramatic moments in 1983. Sergey Shnyryov plays Petrov in the re-enactments.

Peter Anthony made the film over a decade; the process was difficult because of Petrov's reluctance to open up. Anthony said:  "He is quite difficult to work with, as in his day, you could still go to the gulag for disclosing unauthorised information, and as an ex-soldier, he wasn't really interested in discussing his personal feelings. That though is the beauty of the story."

Awards

2013 
Hot Docs Canadian International Documentary Festival
 Nominated, Best International Documentary

2014 
CPH:DOX
 Nominated, Politiken's Audience Award
 Nominated, Nordic Dox Award

Woodstock Film Festival
 Won, Honorable Mention: Audience Award for Best Narrative Feature
 Won, Honorable Mention: James Lyons Award for Best Editing of a Narrative Feature
 Nominated, Jury Prize: Best Narrative Feature

2015 
Nordisk Panorama
 Nominated, Nordic Documentary Film Award

Sunscreen Film Festival, US
 Won, Festival Prize: Best Feature Film

2016 
Robert Awards (Danish Film Academy Award)
 Won the Robert Award for Best Documentary Feature
 Nominated for the Robert Award for Best Score
 Nominated for the Robert Audience Award

Bodil Awards (Danish Film Critics Award)
 Won the Bodil Award for Best Documentary

See also 
 Vasily Arkhipov, a Soviet Naval officer who refused to launch a nuclear torpedo during the 1962 Cuban Missile Crisis
 List of nuclear close calls

References

External links 
 Official website: themanwhosavedtheworldmovie.com
 

2013 documentary films
2013 films
Best Documentary Bodil Award winners
Danish documentary films
Documentary films about the Cold War
2010s Russian-language films
Best Documentary Robert Award winners
2010s English-language films